This is the discography of the Cross Movement. Recently, The Cross Movement's HIStory: Our Place In His Story album received a Stellar Award nomination for "CD of the Year" and "Rap/Hip-Hop/Gospel CD of the Year".

All of the Cross Movement's albums, aside from their Greatest Hits album, start with the letter "H"

Discography

Albums

Compilation albums

Guest appearances
"The Jesus Anthem" by Da' T.R.U.T.H.
"It's the S.O.I." by KJ-52

Cross Movement, The

Hip hop discographies
Cross Movement, The